Xiangshan railway station is a railway station located in Xiangshan District, Hsinchu City, Taiwan. It is located on the West Coast line and is operated by Taiwan Railways. The wooden station building is a city-designated historical monument.

Around the station
 Haishan Fishing Port

References

1902 establishments in Taiwan
Railway stations opened in 1902
Railway stations in Hsinchu
Railway stations served by Taiwan Railways Administration